Bethel University is a private Christian university in Mishawaka, Indiana. It was established in 1947 and is affiliated with the evangelical Christian Missionary Church.

Organization and administration
Bethel is a part of the Council for Christian Colleges and Universities and the Council of Independent Colleges. It is regionally accredited by The Higher Learning Commission.  The institution also has specialized accreditation by The National Council for Accreditation of Teacher Education (NCATE), the National League for Nursing Accrediting Commission (NLNAC), the National Association of Schools of Music (NASM), the International Assembly for Collegiate Business Education (IACBE).

Currently, Bethel is organized into three academic areas: Division of Arts & Sciences; Division of Humanities & Social Sciences; School of Nursing.  Additionally, there are nine graduate programs administered in conjunction with the schools through the Office of Adult and Graduate Studies.

There are approximately 1,339 students distributed across these programs.  About 1,200 are traditional students pursuing bachelor's degrees right after high school.  140 are enrolled in graduate programs. The Bethel University faculty is composed of about 63 full-time members.

Bethel College changed its name to Bethel University upon the end of commencement exercises on May 5, 2019.

Academics 
Bethel University offers undergraduate, graduate and adult degree programs across the spectrum of disciplines that characterizes American higher education at small colleges. The traditional academic majors include a substantial general education component, which is typical of most liberal arts institutions.  With some variation by major program, these students take courses in history, literature, philosophy, fine arts, communication (oral and written), psychology, sociology, science, mathematics, physical education, and foreign language.  Furthermore, because of the university's identification with Christianity, all students take courses in Bible (Old and New Testament) and an introductory theology course.  These general education courses provide a broad background across the disciplines upon which more depth is pursued in a major (or majors).

Athletics
The Bethel athletic teams are called the Pilots. The university is a member of the National Association of Intercollegiate Athletics (NAIA), primarily competing in the Crossroads League (formerly known as the Mid-Central College Conference (MCCC) until after the 2011–12 school year) for most of its sports since the 1981–82 academic year; while its men's & women's swimming & diving teams compete in the Kansas Collegiate Athletic Conference (KCAC); and its women's lacrosse and men's volleyball teams compete in the Wolverine–Hoosier Athletic Conference (WHAC). They are also a member of the National Christian College Athletic Association (NCCAA), primarily competing as an independent in the North Central Region of the Division I level. 

Bethel competes in 25 intercollegiate varsity sports: Men's sports include baseball, basketball, bowling, cross country, golf, soccer, swimming & diving, tennis, track & field (indoor and outdoor) and volleyball; while women's sports include basketball, bowling, cross country, golf, lacrosse, soccer, softball, swimming & diving, tennis, track & field (indoor and outdoor) and volleyball; and co-ed sports include cheerleading and eSports. 

The most recent sports added were men's and women's eSports and men's volleyball. Basketball, baseball, and softball games are broadcast by the Regional Radio Sports Network.

Athletic accomplishments 
 4 NAIA National Championships (3 Men's D-II Basketball, 1 Men's Soccer)
 42 NCCAA National Championships
 15 NAIA Individual National Champions (1 Women's Golf, 1 Men's Swim & Dive, 9 Men's Track, 4 Women's Track)
 136 NAIA All-Americans
 435 NAIA Scholar-Athletes
 19 NAIA National Players of the Week
 71 Conference Regular Season Championship

In addition to athletic competition, Bethel University encourages athletes to undertake short-term missionary work. Over 45 short-term missions trips/task force teams have been taken by teams within the athletic department.

Notable people
 Andrew Clyde, member U.S. House of Representatives
 Mike Lightfoot, college basketball coach 
 Justin Masterson, professional baseball player
 Marci Miller, film and television actor
 Eric Stults, professional baseball player

References

External links
 Official website 
 Official athletics website

Educational institutions established in 1947
Education in St. Joseph County, Indiana
Buildings and structures in St. Joseph County, Indiana

Evangelicalism in Indiana
1947 establishments in Indiana
Mishawaka, Indiana
Council for Christian Colleges and Universities
Private universities and colleges in Indiana